Xerocrassa siphnica is a species of air-breathing land snail, a pulmonate gastropod mollusk in the family Geomitridae.

Distribution

This species is endemic to the island of Siphnos in Greece.

See also
List of non-marine molluscs of Greece

References

 Kobelt, W. (1883). Diagnosen neuer Arten. Nachrichtsblatt der Deutschen Malakozoologischen Gesellschaft. 15 (11/12): 181–183. Frankfurt am Main.

External links
 Mylonas, M.; Botsaris, J.; Sourdis, J.; Valakos, E. (1995). On the development, habitat selection and taxonomy of Helix (Jacosta) siphnica Kobelt (Gastropoda, Helicellinae). Zoological Journal of the Linnean Society. 115: 347–357.

siphnica
Endemic fauna of Greece
Gastropods described in 1883